Satheesh Babu Payyannur (13 August 1963 – 24 November 2022) was a Malayalam–language short story writer and novelist from Kerala, India. His works include the novels Mannu, Daivappura, Manja Sooryante Naalukal and Kudamanikal Kilungiya Raavil, and the short story collections Peramaram, Vrishchikam Vannu Vilichu and Mazhayilundaya Makal. His oeuvre consists of 12 novels and around 200 short stories. The collection Peramaram won the Kerala Sahitya Akademi Award for Story in 2012. He received the Karoor Award, Malayattoor Award, and Thoppil Ravi Award. He was also a media personality and has written, directed and produced television programmes, telefilms, and documentaries.

Early life and education
Satheesh Babu Payyannur was born on 13 August 1963, in Pathirippala, located in the Palghat district of Kerala. His mother hailed from Pathirippala and his father from Payyannur, Kannur district, Kerala. He attended Payyannur Government School, where he began writing stories and features, winning several prizes at school youth festivals. He completed his pre-degree course (PDC) from Payyannur College and went on to earn a Bachelor of Commerce (BCom) degree from Kanhangad Nehru College. During this time, he became known as a writer, publishing stories, poetry, and essays in various periodicals. He also served as editor and publisher of Nehru College's campus newspaper, Campus Times, which was the first campus newspaper from any college in Calicut University.

Career
After completing his education, Satheesh Babu Payyannur took up the role of editor at the Kasaragod-based weekly Ee Aazhcha. However, renowned editor S. Jayachandran Nair advised him not to pursue a full-time career in journalism if he wished to become a writer. Following this advice, Payyannur left his job at Ee Aazhcha and joined the State Bank of Travancore (SBT) in 1985. He worked at the Sreekandapuram and Thrikaripur branches of SBT before being transferred to the Trivandrum branch in 1991. He relocated to Trivandrum with the goal of working as an assistant to writer-director Padmarajan, whom he had befriended during the filming of Innale. However, Padmarajan had died around this time. Nonetheless, Payyannur continued to pursue his interest in cinema, writing the screenplay for the 1992 film Nakshthrakoodaram, which was directed by Padmarajan's assistant Joshy Mathew. Additionally, Payyannur wrote the dialogues for the 1993 live-action animated film O' Faby.

Since Payyannur could not find success in cinema, he transitioned to television where he found success as a director of telefilms, documentaries, and other programmes. He travelled to foreign countries for the series Gulfilunarunnu Keralam (Kerala Waking Up in the Gulf), which was the first Malayalam telefilm to be set and filmed entirely in the Gulf countries. Another notable series was European Sketchukal (European Sketches). In 2001, Payyannur resigned from the State Bank of Travancore to become fully immersed in literary activities and visual media. That same year, he established his own television production company, Panorama, which produced a variety of television programmes, such as Ponpulari on Surya TV. Panorama also published a magazine named Kerala Panorama from Trivandrum and has a YouTube channel by the same name.

During his tenure at the State Bank of Travancore, Payyannur was active in promoting literary events sponsored by the bank and in organising the annual SBT Literary Award. Payyannur was a member of the Kerala Sahitya Akademi and the Kerala State Chalachitra Academy. He also held the position of Member Secretary at Bharat Bhavan, a cultural exchange centre under the Kerala Cultural Affairs Department, for a period of five years.

Death
Payyannur was found dead in his flat at Vanchiyoor near Trivandrum on 24 November 2022. A case was registered for unnatural death, but it was later declared that he died from a heart attack. His last rites were held at Paramekkavu Santhighat in Thrissur. He was survived by his wife Girija, a retired school teacher, and his daughter Varsha, who lives in Pune. 

At the time of his death, Payyannur was working on an unfinished novel titled Sathram, which was based on the life of poet P. Kunhiraman Nair. He was also in talks with publishers about releasing a complete collection of his short stories to coincide with his 60th birthday. Additionally, he was planning a film adaptation of his short story "Lift", with actor Mammootty in the lead role.

Literary career

Short stories

Payyannur began publishing his works in the late 1970s and early 1980s, and his writing soon garnered the attention and admiration of readers through the publication of numerous stories in various periodicals. In total, he published around 200 stories, including "Daivam", "Peramaram", "Vrishchikam Vannu Vilichu", "Manalparappu", "Manassu", "Ilayamma", "Scene Over" and "Lift". His story "Daivam" won the Karoor Award, sponsored by Sahithya Pravarthaka Co-operative Society, in 1984. The story was based on Theyyam, a ritual art form practised in Northern Kerala. 

"Peramaram" ("The Guava Tree"), first published in the Mathrubhumi Illustrated Weekly in April 1989, tells the tale of Kunjuraman Nambiar, Meenakshi Amma, and their beloved guava tree, and the loneliness they face in their old age. "Peramaram" was published as a book only in 2001, in the collection Vrishchikam Vannu Vilichu (Vrischikam Came Calling), which is a collection of 31 stories written between 1988 and 2001. The story gained renewed interest in 2007 when V. K. Sreeraman wrote about it in his column Vazhvum Ninavum in Madhyamam Weekly. The story was later included in the 2011 collection Peramaram, with an introduction by Sreeraman. The collection had 20 stories and received the Kerala Sahitya Akademi Award for Story in 2012. The story "Peramaram" was also included in the 2018 collection Katha (Story).

"Manassu" was published in Kalakaumudi in May 1990 and was inspired by an experience related to Payyannur by the poet Balachandran Chullikkad. Likewise, the story "Vrishchikam Vannu Vilichu" was written in the same year and was based on Payyannur's own experiences during the Payyanur Subramanya temple festival, which takes place for fourteen days in the Malayalam month of Vrischikam. The story "Manalparappu" (1990) is about the intercaste marriage of Alice and Narayanan, and Payyannur wrote it shortly after his own marriage. A collection of his stories with rain as a common theme was published in the 1991 collection Mazhayilundaya Makal. "Ilayamma," another one of his stories, was published in 1993 in Kalakaumudi. Some of his later short stories are inspired by his experiences in cinema and visual media, such as "Scene Over", "Mazha Maranna Sumithra", "Thiruvananthapuram Cinema", "Thiranadakam" and "K. P. Mariamma". The stories "Cinema", "Nightmare" and "Story Board" also talk about the changes in the visual media in recent years.

Some of Payyannur's other short story collections include Khamaruneesayude Koottukari (Khamaruneesa's Friend), Newsreaderum Poochayum (The Newsreader and the Cat), Scene Over and Photo. Newsreaderum Poochayum is a collection of ten stories, including "Vayalattam", "Cinema", "Newsreaderum Poochayum", "Kudi Pallikoodam", "Lift" and "Fathima Suhra". The collection Mazhayilundaya Makalum Mattu Mazhakathakalum was published posthumously in January 2023. Some of his stories are translated into English and compiled in the title The Guava Tree.

Novels
Payyannur wrote his early novels such as Daivappura, Manja Sooryante Naalukal, Mannu, and Vilapavrikshathile Kaattu during the second half of the 1980s while living in Kannur and Kasargod districts. He was captivated by the ritualistic dance form of Kannur known as Theyyam, which formed the background for his 1984 novel Daivappura (Abode of God). Manja Sooryante Naalukal (The Days of the Yellow Sun) narrated the story of the employees of an evening newspaper. Mannu (Soil), set against the backdrop of the Kavumbai agitation of 1949, was written in 1985 when Payyannur worked at the Sreekandapuram branch of the State Bank of Travancore. Kavumbai was only a few kilometres away from Sreekandapuram and Payyannur initially intended to write a feature on the Kavumbai agitation but the story was so compelling that he finally decided to write a novel based on it. The novel was serialised over a period of 35 weeks in the Sunday supplement of Deshabhimani in 1988 and published as a book the following year by Trivandrum-based Chintha Publications, with a preface by E. M. S. Namboodiripad. 

In the novel Vilapavrikshathile Kaattu, Payyannur discussed the lives of Christians who migrated from Travancore to the hills of northern Kerala. His other novels include Ulkhananangal and Kudamanikal Kilungiya Raavil (On the Night When the Bells Tolled), with Ulkhananangal, written during the opening of vaults of the Padmanabhaswamy temple, based on the history of Payyannur and Payyannur Pattu. The novels Oru Superhit Cinemayude Thirakkatha (The Script of a Superhit Film) and Kalikaal were inspired by Payyannur's experiences with visual media and cinema.

Ekantha Rathrikal (Lonely Nights) is a collection of five short novels—Ekantha Rathrikal, Noolkkolangal, Olikkuvan Oridam (A Place to Hide), Nadakam (Drama) and Ninavil Anitha Vararund (Anitha Comes in the Dreams). Moonnu Pranaya Novelettukal is a collection of three short romantic novels—Aval Neeraja (She, Neeraja), Ethetho Pulinangalil, and Sana, the latter based on a same-sex romantic relationship. 

The last published work during his lifetime was Kamal Haasan Abhinayikkathe Poya Oru Cinema (A Film in Which Kamal Haasan Did Not Act) which is a collection of ten novellas including Kamal Haasan Abhinayikkathe Poya Oru Cinema, Oru Asambandha Online Padam (A Ridiculous Online Movie), Sana, Ulahannanum Njanum (Ulahannan and Me), Idanazhiyude Ingeyattathu (On this End of the Corridor), Nadakam (Drama), Thaniye (Alone), Ethetho Pulinangalil and Mazhayude Neenda Viralukal (The Long Fingers of the Rain). Chila Silkian Ninavukal (Some Silk Memories) is a collection of essays and memoirs including the memoirs about P. Kunhiraman Nair, Silk Smitha and Padmarajan.

Awards
 1985: Karoor Award by Sahithya Pravarthaka Co-operative Society for "Daivam"
 2006: Abu Dhabi Sakthi Award for Story for Scene Over
 2012: Kerala Sahitya Akademi Award for Story for Peramaram
 2014: Abu Dhabi Sakthi Award for Novel for Ulkhananangal
 2017: Malayattoor Award for Khamaruneesayude Koottukari
 2018: Thoppil Ravi Award for Photo
 2022: Ankanam Shamsudheen Smruthi Award for Short Story for Newsreaderum Poochayum
 Kerala Sahitya Vedi Award for Mannu
 SBT Literary Award for Scene Over
 TKD Memorial Award for Peramaram
 FOKANA International Award for Peramaram
 Atlas-Kairali Literary Award for Ulkhananangal

Bibliography

References

1963 births
2022 deaths
Malayali people
Writers from Kerala
Malayalam-language writers
Malayalam short story writers
Indian male short story writers
20th-century Indian male writers
21st-century Indian male writers
20th-century Indian short story writers
21st-century Indian short story writers
Malayalam novelists
Indian male novelists
20th-century Indian novelists
21st-century Indian novelists
Novelists from Kerala
Malayalam-language journalists
Journalists from Kerala
Indian male journalists
21st-century Indian screenwriters
Screenwriters from Kerala
Malayalam screenwriters
Indian male screenwriters
Recipients of the Kerala Sahitya Akademi Award
Recipients of the Abu Dhabi Sakthi Award